The 2020 Grand Canyon men's soccer team represented Grand Canyon University during the 2020 NCAA Division I men's soccer season. It was the 36th season of the Grand Canyon men's soccer team.

Effects of the Covid-19 Pandemic 
On August 13, 2020, the Western Athletic Conference postponed all fall sports through the end of the calendar year.

On November 4, 2020, the NCAA approved a plan for college soccer to be played in the spring.

Roster 
Source:

Matches

Preseason

Regular season

Postseason

WAC Tournament

NCAA Tournament

References 

2020
Grand Canyon Antelopes
Grand Canyon Antelopes
Grand Canyon Antelopes men's soccer
Grand Canyon